The shaftment is an obsolete unit of length defined since the 12th century as 6 inches, which nowadays is exactly . A shaftment was traditionally the width of the fist and outstretched thumb. The lengths of poles, staves, etc. can be easily measured by grasping the bottom of the staff with thumb extended and repeating such hand over hand grips along the length of the staff.

History 

It occurs in Anglo-Saxon written records as early as 910 and in English as late as 1474.

Spelling and etymology 

Other spellings include schaftmond and scaeftemunde, and shathmont.
It is derived from Old English , in turn from Proto-Germanic *skaftaz (shaft) and OE , from the Proto-Germanic *mund, in turn from Proto-Indo-European root *man (hand.)

This unit has mostly fallen out of use, as have others based on the human arm: digit ( shaftment), finger ( shaftment), palm ( shaftment) hand ( shaftment), span (1.5 shaftments), cubit (3 shaftments) and ell (7.5 shaftments).

References 
Units: S University of North Carolina at Chapel Hill - How Many? - A Dictionary of Units of Measurement

Units of length
Human-based units of measurement